Biokovo Nature Park is the most dominating presence on the southern Dalmatian coast. Proclaimed a nature park in 1981, this mountain rampart towers a good 1500 meters over the Makarska Riviera and offers exceptional views over the sea and nearby islands. It is one of Croatia's most popular destinations for hikers with myriad paths that wind up the hills past olive groves, vineyards and pine forests. The Biokovo massif that stretches 36 kilometers along the coast and nine kilometers inland drops down in a series of craggy limestone rocks and sheer cliffs interspersed with caves, pits and sinkholes. The most popular hiking and mountaineering destination is Vosac (1421 meters) which lies only 2.5 kilometers from Makarska.

The Nature Park covers an area of 19,550 hectares and its highest point is Sveti Jure (1762 meters).

Due to its relative isolation the nature park hosts many endemic plant species, for example Biokovo bellflower. Notable nature landmark Kotisina Botanical Garden is also in the region (located 3 kilometers from Makarska).

Part of the Zabiokovlje is in the Biokovo Nature Park.

Geology

At the end of the Cretaceous era, about 65 million years ago, the African plate began colliding with the Eurasian plate. The narrowing of the ocean caused strong tectonic disturbances, making the horizontal layers crinkle, break and emerge above the sea surface, forming mountain ranges like the Alps and the Dinarides, which Biokovo belongs to. In this way the ancient ocean Tethys has largely disappeared and its remains is today's Mediterranean Sea.

The material in the lower parts towards the sea and on the opposite Zagorje side is mainly made up of Eocene Flysch sediments while the higher parts are shaped into carbonate sedimentary rocks.

Vegetation
The vegetation in the Biokovo Nature Park is diverse and rich as it is a mixture of the oldest Mediterranean, Boreal and Central newer floral elements. For example, drypis spinosa, moltkia petraea, salvia officinalis, lilium martagon, campanula portenschlagiana, edraianthus pumilio, various pines (Dalmatian black pine, Aleppo pine)

References

Nature parks of Croatia
Protected areas of Split-Dalmatia County